Pagurus pollicaris is a hermit crab commonly found along the Atlantic coast of North America from New Brunswick to the Gulf of Mexico. It is known by a number of common names, including gray hermit crab, flat-clawed hermit crab, flatclaw hermit crab, shield hermit crab, thumb-clawed hermit crab, broad-clawed hermit crab, and warty hermit crab.

P. pollicaris inhabits the shells of shark eye snails and whelks. The shell is often shared by the commensal zebra flatworm (Stylochus ellipticus).

The diet of the flat-clawed hermit crab comprises organic matter, algae, and sometimes other hermit crabs. Fish are the most important predators of this species.

References

Hermit crabs
Crustaceans of the Atlantic Ocean
Crustaceans described in 1817